Mark Hurst (born 21 October 1995) is a Scottish former footballer who played as a goalkeeper for East Fife and Livingston.

Career

Tynecastle and Livingston
Hurst began his career in the Tynecastle youth academy before leaving to join Livingston in 2011.

St Johnstone and loan spells
He transferred to St Johnstone's youth academy in 2013 and signed a professional deal with the club in 2015.  Later that year, Hurst went out on loan to Elgin City in search of playing time.  He made 35 appearances for the Black and Whites before returning to his parent club.

The following season, Hurst went out on loan again.  This time he headed to East Fife where he made 24 appearances for the Fifers.

Hurst returned to Bayview Stadium the following season for another loan spell, this time turning out 14 times for East Fife.

In 2019, Hurst decided to leave St Johnstone, much to his manager Tommy Wright's surprise and disappointment.  It is believed Hurst left the club to move to USA to be with his girlfriend.

International career
Hurst made one appearance for Scotland U19, coming on as a 70th minute substitute for Ross Stewart in a 4-2 win over Switzerland on 5 March 2014 at the Almondvale Stadium.

References

External links
Mark Hurst on Soccerbase

1995 births
Living people
Scottish footballers
Scottish Football League players
Association football defenders
Livingston F.C. players
Tynecastle F.C. players
East Fife F.C. players
St Johnstone F.C. players
Elgin City F.C. players
People from Edinburgh